Fearless Frank Foster is an album by saxophonist Frank Foster recorded in 1965 and released on the Prestige label.

Reception

Allmusic awarded the album 4 stars with its review by Scott Yanow stating, "Foster performs five originals, some of which fall into the area of funky hard bop. Spirited music".

Track listing 
All compositions by Frank Foster except as indicated
 "Raunchy Rita" - 5:28  
 "Janie Huk" - 11:16  
 "Thingaroo" - 3:30  
 "Baby Ann" - 6:00  
 "Jitterbug Waltz" (Fats Waller) - 9:20  
 "Disapproachment" - 5:46

Personnel 
Frank Foster - tenor saxophone
Virgil Jones - trumpet
Al Dailey - piano
Bob Cunningham - bass
Alan Dawson - drums

References 

Frank Foster (musician) albums
1966 albums
Prestige Records albums
Albums produced by Cal Lampley
Albums recorded at Van Gelder Studio